Arthur Maxwell may refer to:

Public officials
Arthur Maxwell, 11th Baron Farnham (1879–1957), Irish Representative peer and Nova Scotia baronet
Arthur Maxwell, British Commissioner of Police (Hong Kong), 1953–1959

Others
Arthur Maxwell (before 1760–after 1800), English naval officer; commanded Hired armed lugger Valiant
Arthur S. Maxwell (1896–1970), English author, editor and administrator of Seventh-day Adventist Church
Arthur Maxwell (actor) (born 1919), American musical comedy performer in Me and Juliet etc.

Characters
Arthur Maxwell, recurring character in novelist Terry Pratchett's series, Johnny Maxwell

See also
Arthur Maxwell House (1926–2013), Canadian neurologist and lieutenant governor of Newfoundland and Labrador
Maxwell (surname)